Scredda is a hamlet in the civil parish of Treverbyn in mid Cornwall, England, United Kingdom. It lies just north of St Austell.

References

Hamlets in Cornwall